In enzymology, a glutarate—CoA ligase is an enzyme that catalyzes the chemical reaction

ATP + glutarate + CoA  ADP + phosphate + glutaryl-CoA

The 3 substrates of this enzyme are ATP, glutarate, and CoA, whereas its 3 products are ADP, phosphate, and glutaryl-CoA.

This enzyme belongs to the family of ligases, specifically those forming carbon-sulfur bonds as acid-thiol ligases.  The systematic name of this enzyme class is glutarate:CoA ligase (ADP-forming). Other names in common use include glutaryl-CoA synthetase, and glutaryl coenzyme A synthetase.  This enzyme participates in fatty acid metabolism and lysine degradation.

References

 

EC 6.2.1
Enzymes of unknown structure